Josef Paleček (born May 5, 1949) is a Czech former ice hockey player who is known as a head coach in the Czech Extraliga, and as an assistant coach for the Czech Republic men's national ice hockey teams at the 2006, 2007, 2008, and 2011 IIHF World Championships.

International career 
Paleček played with the Czech Republic men's national ice hockey team at the 1972, 1973, and 1974 World Ice Hockey Championships, where he help his team win gold, bronze, and silver medals.

References

External links

1949 births
Living people
People from Kolín District
Czech ice hockey forwards
EHC Black Wings Linz players
HC Dukla Jihlava players
HC Dynamo Pardubice players
Sportspeople from the Central Bohemian Region
Czechoslovak ice hockey forwards
Czech ice hockey coaches
Czechoslovak ice hockey coaches
Stadion Hradec Králové players
ESV Kaufbeuren players
Augsburger Panther players
Czechoslovak expatriate ice hockey people
Czechoslovak expatriate sportspeople in West Germany
Expatriate ice hockey players in West Germany
Czechoslovak expatriate sportspeople in Austria
Expatriate ice hockey players in Austria